The John Burrier House, on Kentucky Route 1966 in what is now Lexington, Kentucky , was listed on the National Register of Historic Places in 1983.

It is a one-story three-bay dry stone wing of a former two-story house.  It is also known as the Stone Grange and as Burrier Place.

References

Houses on the National Register of Historic Places in Kentucky
Federal architecture in Kentucky
National Register of Historic Places in Lexington, Kentucky
Houses in Lexington, Kentucky
Stone houses in Kentucky